L&T Realty Limited is a real estate development company and is part of the Larsen & Toubro Group, an Indian multinational conglomerate in technology, engineering, construction, manufacturing and financial services. Headquartered in Mumbai, Maharashtra, L&T Realty has a strong presence across Mumbai, Bangalore and Chennai. The Company undertakes various projects encompassing the construction of residential, corporate office, retail, leisure and entertainment spaces. Besides independent projects, L&T Realty also undertakes co-development projects for various reputed builders. Currently, it has over 35 million sq. ft. of area under various stages of development.

Projects

Crescent Bay is being developed by L&T Realty in collaboration with Omkar Realtors and Developers. It is a gated residential complex in Parel, Mumbai. The complex consists of six towers on an elevated podium aligned to form a crescent shape overlooking the Arabian Sea.
Emerald Isle is an upcoming 16-acre gated complex in Powai, Mumbai. It is located in close proximity to the Powai Lake and adjacent to the L&T Business Park. Clubhouse & recreational facilities are planned within its premises. 
Raintree Boulevard is a township by L&T Realty located in Hebbal, Bengaluru where it is developing residential apartments on about 65 acres of land with a strong emphasis on environmental management. The project is located before GKVK university on the way to new airport.
Seawoods Grand Central is a 40-acre transit-oriented development (TOD) project in Navi Mumbai, built around the railway station of Seawoods-Darave. It has a mix of retail and commercial office spaces.
 In Hyderabad, L&T Group is developing Commercial, Retail and Office Spaces around the Metro Project.
Eden Park project is based in Siruseri, Chennai. It is situated off the Old Mahabalipuram Road and right beside the SIPCOT IT Park. Phase I of the project is already delivered. The Phase II of Eden Park is right now under construction. In Siruseri, just behind SIPCOT IT Park, there is one of the Chennai's top institutions, Padma Seshadri Bala Bhavan Senior Secondary School (PSBB). The school is located inside the gated community, L&T Eden Park.
Commercial special economic zone (SEZ) project based on north Bengaluru obtained consent on March, 2017.
Residential project in Nirmal Lifestyle, Mulund: L&T Realty entered into an agreement with Nirmal Lifestyle Developers to jointly develop a nearly 20-acre land parcel on LBS Marg in Mumbai's north central suburb of Mulund.

See also

 Elante Mall
 Hyderabad Metro Rail
 Larsen & Toubro
 Lotus Temple
 Seawoods–Darave railway station

References

External links
 
 L&T Eden Park Chennai

Larsen & Toubro
Construction and civil engineering companies of India
Real estate companies based in Mumbai
Construction and civil engineering companies established in 2007
Indian companies established in 2007
Real estate companies established in 2007
2007 establishments in Maharashtra